36th Precinct may refer to:

 36th Precinct, a 2004 French film
 36 Quai des Orfèvres, the headquarters of the Paris police